Hieracium duriceps is a species of flowering plant belonging to the family Asteraceae.

Its native range is Ireland and Scotland.

References

duriceps